Hurko  is a village in the administrative district of Gmina Medyka, within Przemyśl County, Subcarpathian Voivodeship, in south-eastern Poland. It is close to the border with Ukraine.

The village has a population of 520.

References

Villages in Przemyśl County